The Crystal World is a science fiction novel by English author J. G. Ballard, published in 1966. The novel tells the story of a physician trying to make his way deep into the jungle to a secluded leprosy treatment facility.  While trying to make it to his destination, his chaotic path leads him to try to come to terms with an apocalyptic phenomenon in the jungle that crystallises everything it touches.

Ballard previously used the theme of apocalyptic crystallisation in the 1964 short story "The Illuminated Man" (included in The Terminal Beach), which is also set in the same locations.

Plot summary 

The protagonist is Edward Sanders, an English medical doctor, who arrives at the river port of Port Matarre, in Cameroon. From here he tries to reach a leprosy treatment facility where his friends, Max and Suzanne Clair, live. Soon, however, he starts to recognize that a mysterious phenomenon is crystallizing the jungle along with its living creatures. The same phenomenon is reported to be present in the Florida everglades and in the Pripyat Marshes (Soviet Union) as well. Scientific explanations of the phenomenon are provided within the book: however, Ballard offers mostly an interior and psychological perspective about it, directly through Sanders' experiences. Several facts, furthermore, remain unexplained: for example, the ability of jewels to liquefy the crystals. The crystals also have the property to keep objects and beings in a suspended state of existence. Many passages deal with this characteristic, pointing out its capability to stop time and life.

In his route towards the deep of the forest, Sanders gets involved in a personal feud between Ventress, a Belgian architect, and Thorensen, the director of a diamond mine. In one of the most striking episodes of the novel, Sanders discovers the reason of the deadly rivalry to be Ventress' former wife, Serena, who is terminally ill with tuberculosis. After a final confrontation, Thorensen decides to remain in his house within the jungle, in spite of the encroaching crystallization process. Two of the other characters met by Sanders in his voyage spontaneously make the same decision: Balthus, an apostate priest, and Suzanne. The latter, nearly gone mad and sporting the first symptoms of leprosy, is portrayed towards the end of the novel as the leader of a band of lepers who set for the interior of the crystallizing forest, clearly to never come back.

After having barely escaped from the now quickly spreading crystallization, Sanders reaches Port Matarre. Here, however, he makes the same decision as Balthus and Suzanne. In the final pages, Sanders goes back to the river to face the same fate as Suzanne.

Reception
Richard A. Lupoff described The Crystal World as the best of Ballard's "catastrophe novels," saying it was "Idiosyncratic but highly effective [and] a very important science fiction book."

References

External links

The Terminal Collection: JG Ballard First Editions 
 The Crystal World by J.G. Ballard, reviewed by Ted Gioia (Conceptual Fiction)

1966 British novels
1966 science fiction novels
Jonathan Cape books
Novels by J. G. Ballard